Francis Dufour (March 28, 1929 – May 25, 2020) was a Canadian Quebec politician. He served as the member for Jonquière in the National Assembly of Quebec as a member of the Parti Québécois from 1985 until 1996, when he relinquished his seat to allow Lucien Bouchard, the Premier of Quebec, a seat in the assembly.

Biography

Dufour was a clerk at the Arvida Municipal Treasury in 1947. He worked for Alcan from 1948 to 1975, and served as the director of its employees' union from 1955 to 1963.

Political career

Dufour was elected a councillor of Arvida from 1960 until 1964. He was elected mayor in 1967 and served in that position until 1975.

During that time Dufour ran in the 1973 Quebec election for the Parti Québécois in Jonquière and lost to incumbent Gérald Harvey.

When Arvida was amalgamated into Jonquière, he ran for and was elected to the position of its mayor. Dufour served as President of the Union of Quebec Municipalities from 1982 until 1984.

Dufour ran again for Jonquière in 1985 and won. He was re-elected in 1989 and 1994.

He served primarily as a backbencher during his time in the legislature. He resigned on January 15, 1996 to let Lucien Bouchard,  Premier of Quebec have a seat in the legislature.

Electoral record

Provincial

References 

1929 births
2020 deaths
Canadian trade unionists
French Quebecers
Parti Québécois MNAs
Politicians from Saguenay, Quebec
20th-century Canadian politicians